The Mitsubishi AAM-4 (Type 99 air-to-air missile) is a medium-range active radar homing air-to-air missile. It is a modern beyond-visual-range missile developed in Japan and intended to replace the semi-active radar homing AIM-7 Sparrow missile in service. It has been operational since 1999. The main contractor is Mitsubishi Electric. The 2010 AAM-4B was the world's first air-to-air missile with an AESA radar seeker.

The AAM-4 is too large to fit in the internal weapons bay of the F-35 Lightning II. This has led to a program with MBDA UK to adapt the latest AAM-4 seeker technology to MBDA's Meteor missile airframe to produce the JNAAM.

Development
The improved AAM-4B was the world's first air-to-air missile with an AESA radar seeker. The AAM-4B entered production in 2010 for service on the F-15J and F-2, but it is too large to be carried in the weapons bay of the F-35 Lightning II. On 17 July 2014, Japan announced a collaboration with the United Kingdom to study the development of a new Joint New Air-to-Air Missile (JNAAM). MBDA UK is prime contractor on the Meteor missile which entered service on the Saab JAS 39 Gripen in 2016 and on the Eurofighter Typhoon and Dassault Rafale in 2018, and can fit in the internal weapons bay of the F-35. It has a unique variable-flow ramjet motor that according to MBDA gives the Meteor the largest no-escape zone of any air-to-air missile. The JNAAM will "[combine] the UK's missile-related technologies and Japanese seeker technologies", possibly with some adjustments to help the missile fit better in the F-35 weapons bay.

Variants

AAM-4 – Original version with  range that entered service in 1999.
AAM-4B – Improved version introduced in 2010 with a Ka band millimetric frequency AESA seeker and  range. The seeker also utilized to the Type 12 Surface-to-Ship Missile.
XRIM-4 – Naval surface-launched variant, project was previously canceled but effectively resurrected in 2016.
Ducted rocket flying object – Throttleable Ducted Rocket (TDR) Test model.

Operators

Japan Air Self-Defense Force
F-15J Eagle
Mitsubishi F-2

Specifications
 Length: 3,667 mm
 Diameter: 203 mm
 Wing span: 800 mm
 Weight: 
 Guidance: inertial guidance, mid-course update + terminal active radar homing
 Range: 100 km (AAM-4), 120 km (AAM-4B)
 Speed: Mach 4–5

See also
AAM-1 (Japanese missile)
AAM-2
AAM-3
AAM-5 (Japanese missile) – short range heatseeking missile introduced 2004
AIM-120 AMRAAM
Sky Sword 2
Meteor (missile)
PL-12
PL-15
R-77

References

External links
FAS AAM4 
Global Security AAM4

Air-to-air missiles of Japan
Mitsubishi Electric products, services and standards
Military equipment introduced in the 1990s
Fire-and-forget weapons